The Praemium Erasmianum Foundation is a Dutch  cultural institution that works in the humanities, the social science and the arts. It was founded in 1958  by Prince Bernhard of Lippe-Biesterfeld. The aim of the Foundation is to strengthen the position of the arts, the social sciences and the humanities. The Foundation is motivated by the ideas of Desiderius Erasmus, from whom it derives its name, and European cultural traditions. Humanistic values, such as tolerance, cultural pluralism and critical thinking, are reflected in the choice of the Erasmus Prize laureates and in the activities around the theme of the Prize.

Governance 
The Foundation's patron is King Willem-Alexander of the Netherlands. It is governed by a board with members representing the cultural, scholarly and business communities in the Netherlands.  the Board consists of Ernst Hirsch Ballin (Chair), Jet de Ranitz (Vice-Chair), Tom de Swaan (Treasurer), Désanne van Brederode, Barnita Bagchi, Naomi Ellemers, Maria Grever, Bregtje van der Haak, Bas ter Haar Romeny, Fouad Laroui, Rick Lawson, Axel Rüger, Henk Scholten, Ed Spanjaard and Frank van Vree.  the organisation has three staff members, and the director is Shanti van Dam. Funding for the Foundation originally came from the Dutch lottery and the Sport Totaliser, although it is now financially independent.

Prizes 
The Foundation awards the Erasmus Prize, which is an annual prize that is awarded to individuals or institutions who have made exceptional contributions to culture, society, or social science in Europe and the rest of the world. The Foundation organizes a wide range of academic and cultural activities around the Erasmus Prize award ceremony, as well as an essay or publications based on the laureate and their work. The Foundation has also awarded annual Research Prizes since 1988.  it awards up to five prizes of €3,000 each to PhD graduates who have written an outstanding thesis in the humanities and social sciences. The prizes are awarded by the Foundation's director at a ceremony that normally takes place in May.

References

External links

Foundations based in the Netherlands
1958 establishments in the Netherlands